Sayed Yousuf Halim ( – 17 October 2022) was an Afghan judge. He was chief justice of Afghanistan from 2014 to 2021.

References 

20th-century births
Year of birth missing
2022 deaths
20th-century Afghan people
21st-century Afghan people
Afghan judges
Supreme Court Justices of Afghanistan